Get Over It is a 2001 American teen comedy film loosely based on William Shakespeare's A Midsummer Night's Dream about a high school senior who desperately tries to win back his ex-girlfriend by joining the school play she and her new boyfriend are performing in, against the advice of friends. The film was directed by Tommy O'Haver for Miramax Films and written by R. Lee Fleming Jr.. The film was released on March 9, 2001, and stars Ben Foster, Kirsten Dunst, Melissa Sagemiller, Sisqó, Shane West, Colin Hanks, Zoe Saldana, Mila Kunis, Swoosie Kurtz, Ed Begley Jr., Carmen Electra and Martin Short. The film grossed $19 million against a budget of $22 million.

Plot 
After Berke Landers' girlfriend Allison breaks up with him, he tries to win her back by auditioning for the school play, despite having no theatrical talent. Meanwhile, his friends Felix and Dennis try to find him a new girlfriend.

With the help of Felix's younger sister Kelly, Berke wins a minor role in the play, a modern musical version of Shakespeare's comedy A Midsummer Night's Dream called A Midsummer Night's Rockin' Eve, written and directed by the school's domineering drama teacher, Dr. Desmond Oates (Martin Short). When one of the leads, the school's star actor Peter Wong, is injured in a freak accident, Berke takes over Wong's role of Lysander. He gradually improves with continuing assistance from Kelly, unaware of the growing attraction between them.

At a party thrown by Felix at Berke's house, Kelly kisses Berke, but he insists that a relationship between them could not work as she is Felix's sister. At the same party, Berke and Allison catch her new boyfriend Bentley "Striker" Scrumfeld cheating on her with her best friend Maggie. Allison breaks up with Striker.

During the intermission on the play's opening night, Allison confides to Berke that she wants to get back together with him. Meanwhile, Striker bribes two of the theater technicians to try and blow Berke off the stage using stage pyrotechnics. Before the play resumes, Felix gives the orchestra sheet music for a love ballad written by Kelly to replace Oates' unpopular tune.

When the curtain rises, Kelly sings her song so beautifully that Berke finally realizes he loves her. He abandons his lines from the script and improvises his own verse professing his character's love for Kelly's character Helena. The audience applauds as Berke and Kelly kiss. Striker protests this change, but unwittingly signals the technicians to set off the explosion, blowing him offstage and into the orchestral section.

Dennis kisses Kelly's friend and his dancing partner Basin, who kisses him back, suggesting that they also begin a relationship. Kelly and Berke leave the theater looking forward to their future together.

The film ends with Sisqó and Vitamin C singing and dancing along with the cast to the song "September" as the credits roll.

Cast

Production 
Get Over It was filmed in Ontario, Canada. Filming began on June 1, 2000, and ended August 2, 2000, lasting 63 days. Scenes that took place in high school were filmed at Port Credit Secondary School. Other locations in Ontario included Mississauga, Toronto and Port Credit. Co-stars Kirsten Dunst and Ben Foster dated from late 2000 to early 2001. The late singer and actress Aaliyah was considered for the role of Maggie in the film, but the part was given to Zoe Saldana.

Release 
The film was released in the US on March 9, 2001, by Miramax. The film then opened in the UK on June 10, 2001, by Momentum Pictures, and in Australia on September 6, 2001, by Buena Vista International.

The film opened at number 7 in 1,742 screens and in the North American box office with $4,134,977. The film began to drop down and closed after five weeks. The film grossed $11,576,464 overall in the US. The film opened in the UK box office on June 10, 2001, in 339 screens, earning £887,133 by the end of the weekend. The film earned £4,972,797 in the UK. By the end of its run, the film earned $8,323,902 in foreign markets. Based on a $22 million budget, Get Over It earned $19,900,366 worldwide, making it a box office failure.

Home media 
The film was released on DVD & VHS in the US by Miramax Home Entertainment on August 14, 2001, and in the UK by Momentum Pictures on April 1, 2002. Special features include a commentary track with director Tommy O'Haver & screenwriter R. Lee Fleming Jr., deleted & extended scenes with optional commentary, original songs, outtakes with Martin Short, a makeup test also with Short, two music videos including "The Itch" by Vitamin C and an original song titled "Love Scud" by fictional boy band "The Swingtown Lads" and a behind-the-scenes featurette. The film was re-released on DVD on May 15, 2012, by Echo Bridge Home Entertainment, as part of a deal with Miramax, and contains no special features or subtitle tracks.

Reception
Get Over It received mixed reviews from critics. On Rotten Tomatoes the film has an approval rating of 43% based on reviews from 65 critics, with an average score of 4.90/10. The site's consensus states: "As with most teen movies, Get Over It is entirely predictable, and there's not enough plot to sustain the length of the movie. However, it is not without its charms." On Metacritic the film has a weighted average score of 52 out of 100 based on 14 reviews.

Mick La Salle with the San Francisco Chronicle gave the film a positive review and wrote: "Breaks the formula for teen romances. Martin Short, as the vain and zany drama teacher, does not disappoint."
Eddie Cockrell of Variety magazine gave a mixed review, describing the film as "A mildly diverting, largely inoffensive teen laffer that's long on cartoonish high school hijinks but short on dramatic concentration and crucial story details."
Ernest Hardy of L.A. Weekly gave the film a negative review and called the film a "lobotomized updating of A Midsummer Night's Dream".

Music

Featured music
Other music featured in the film but omitted from the soundtrack includes:
 "Happiness (The Eat Me Edit)" – Pizzaman
 "Magic Carpet Ride (Matt Philly Remix)" – The Mighty Dub Katz
 "Champion Birdwatchers" – LA Symphony
 "Love Scud" – The Swingtown Lads
 "Morse" – Nightmares on Wax
 "A Little Soul (Lafayette Velvet Revisited Mix)" – Pulp
 "Reach Inside" – Boh Samba
 "Phthalo Blue" – The Fairways
 "The Itch" – Vitamin C
 "Get On It (Krafty Kuts Latin Funk Mix)" – Resident Filters
 "Pass It On" – Keoki
 "September" – Sisqó & Vitamin C

References

External links 
 
 
 
 
 

2001 films
2000s musical films
2001 romantic comedy films
2000s teen comedy films
American high school films
American independent films
American romantic comedy films
American romantic musical films
American teen comedy films
Films based on A Midsummer Night's Dream
Films shot in Ontario
Teen films based on works by William Shakespeare
Films directed by Tommy O'Haver
Dimension Films films
Films scored by Steve Bartek
Works by R. Lee Fleming Jr.
2000s English-language films
2000s American films
2001 independent films